Danta is a village in Ajmer tehsil of Ajmer district of Rajasthan state in India. The village falls under Danta gram panchayat.

Demography 
As per 2011 census of India, Danta has population of 2,253 of which 1,163 are males and 1,090 are females. Sex ratio of the village is 937.

Transportation
Danta is connected by air (Kishangarh Airport), by train (Ajmer Junction railway station) and by road.

See also
Ajmer Tehsil

References

Villages in Ajmer district